Juan Pablo Úbeda Pesce (born July 31, 1980) is a Chilean former footballer who played as a striker.

International career
Úbeda played for Chile at the 1997 FIFA U-17 World Championship in Egypt. Previously, he took part in the South American Championship.

Personal life
As a football player, 'Ubeda was nicknamed Spiderman due to the fact that he used to put on a mask of this superhero to celebrate his goals. 

Following his retirement from football, he has developed a professional career in car racing. Through his maternal line, he has inherited this passion since his mother, Josefina Pesce, was a car racing champion and his uncle, Lino Pesce, was a F3 race driver who competed at the Autódromo Las Vizcachas in Santiago, Chile.

References

External links
 Úbeda at Football Lineups
 
 
 Juan Pablo Úbeda at PlaymakerStats

1980 births
Living people
Footballers from Santiago
Chilean people of Italian descent
Chilean footballers
Chilean expatriate footballers
Chile youth international footballers
Unión Española footballers
U.C. Sampdoria players
Club Deportivo Universidad Católica footballers
Colo-Colo footballers
Ciudad de Murcia footballers
Alicante CF footballers
Everton de Viña del Mar footballers
Club Deportivo Palestino footballers
Zamora FC players
S.S. Virtus Lanciano 1924 players
Lobos BUAP footballers
Curicó Unido footballers
Chilean Primera División players
Serie A players
Segunda División players
Segunda División B players
Serie C players
Ascenso MX players
Primera B de Chile players
Expatriate footballers in Italy
Expatriate footballers in Spain
Expatriate footballers in Mexico
Chilean expatriate sportspeople in Italy
Chilean expatriate sportspeople in Spain
Chilean expatriate sportspeople in Mexico
Association football forwards
Chilean racing drivers